Eressa nigra is a moth of the family Erebidae. It was discovered by George Hampson in 1893. It is found in India (Simla).

References

 

Eressa
Moths described in 1893